Pyar Pyar is a 1993 Bollywood film starring Sujoy Mukherjee. The film also stars Rajeshwari Sachdev and Faraz Khan in supporting roles.

Story
Widowed Rajkumar Chauhan is an honest and diligent Income Tax Officer, who does his job without being intimidated or accepting bribes. The role is played by Paresh Rawal.

Soundtrack
"Dagi Dum Dum" -  Sadhana Sargam, Nitin Mukesh
"Ek Tere Hi Chehre Pe Pyar Aaya" - Kumar Sanu, Anuradha Paudwal
"Elaan Yeh Karte Hein" - Anuradha Paudwal, Mohammed Aziz
"Kahan Ja Rahe Ho Savere Savere" - Suresh Wadkar
"Operator Operator" - Vinod Rathod, Sapna Mukherjee
"Paas Hi Mera Ghar Hai" - Kumar Sanu, Anuradha Paudwal

References

External links
 

1993 films
Films scored by Nadeem–Shravan
1990s Hindi-language films